

Events

Pre-1600
1112 – Ramon Berenguer III, Count of Barcelona, and Douce I, Countess of Provence, marry, uniting the fortunes of those two states.
1451 – Sultan Mehmed II inherits the throne of the Ottoman Empire.
1488 – Bartolomeu Dias of Portugal lands in Mossel Bay after rounding the Cape of Good Hope, becoming the first known European to travel so far south.
1509 – The Portuguese navy defeats a joint fleet of the Ottoman Empire, the Republic of Venice, the Sultan of Gujarat, the Mamlûk Burji Sultanate of Egypt, the Zamorin of Calicut, and the Republic of Ragusa at the Battle of Diu in Diu, India.
1583 – Battle of São Vicente takes place off Portuguese Brazil where three English warships led by navigator Edward Fenton fight off three Spanish galleons sinking one in the process.

1601–1900
1661 – Maratha forces under Chattrapati Shivaji Maharaj defeat the Mughals in the Battle of Umberkhind.
1690 – The colony of Massachusetts issues the first paper money in the Americas.
1706 – During the Battle of Fraustadt Swedish forces defeat a superior Saxon-Polish-Russian force by deploying a double envelopment.
1716 – The 1716 Algiers earthquake sequence began with an  7.0 mainshock that caused severe damage and killed 20,000 in Algeria.
1781 – American Revolutionary War: British forces seize the Dutch-owned Caribbean island Sint Eustatius.
1783 – Spain–United States relations are first established.
1787 – Militia led by General Benjamin Lincoln crush the remnants of Shays' Rebellion in Petersham, Massachusetts.
1807 – A British military force, under Brigadier-General Sir Samuel Auchmuty captures the Spanish Empire city of Montevideo, now the capital of Uruguay.
1809 – The Territory of Illinois is created by the 10th United States Congress.
1813 – José de San Martín defeats a Spanish royalist army at the Battle of San Lorenzo, part of the Argentine War of Independence.
1830 – The London Protocol of 1830 establishes the full independence and sovereignty of Greece from the Ottoman Empire as the final result of the Greek War of Independence.
1870 – The Fifteenth Amendment to the United States Constitution is ratified, guaranteeing voting rights to male citizens regardless of race.

1901–present
1913 – The Sixteenth Amendment to the United States Constitution is ratified, authorizing the Federal government to impose and collect an income tax.
1916 – The Centre Block of the Parliament buildings in Ottawa, Ontario, Canada burns down with the loss of seven lives.  
1917 – World War I: The American entry into World War I begins when diplomatic relations with Germany are severed due to its unrestricted submarine warfare.
1927 – A revolt against the military dictatorship of Portugal breaks out at Oporto.
1930 – Communist Party of Vietnam is founded at a "Unification Conference" held in Kowloon, British Hong Kong.
1931 – The Hawke's Bay earthquake, New Zealand's worst natural disaster, kills 258.
1933 – Adolf Hitler announces that the expansion of Lebensraum into Eastern Europe, and its ruthless Germanisation, are the ultimate geopolitical objectives of Nazi foreign policy.
1943 – The  is sunk by a German U-boat. Only 230 of 902 men aboard survive. 
1944 – World War II: During the Gilbert and Marshall Islands campaign, U.S. Army and Marine forces seize Kwajalein Atoll from the defending Japanese garrison.
1945 – World War II: As part of Operation Thunderclap, 1,000 B-17s of the Eighth Air Force bomb Berlin, a raid which kills between 2,500 and 3,000 and  another 120,000.
  1945   – World War II: The United States and the Philippine Commonwealth begin a month-long battle to retake Manila from Japan.
1953 – The Batepá massacre occurred in São Tomé when the colonial administration and Portuguese landowners unleashed a wave of violence against the native creoles known as forros.
1958 – Founding of the Benelux Economic Union, creating a testing ground for a later European Economic Community.
1959 – Rock and roll musicians Buddy Holly, Ritchie Valens, and J. P. "The Big Bopper" Richardson are killed in a plane crash along with the pilot near Clear Lake, Iowa, an event later known as The Day the Music Died.
  1959   – Sixty-five people are killed when American Airlines Flight 320 crashes into the East River on approach to LaGuardia Airport in New York City.
1960 – British Prime Minister Harold Macmillan speaks of "a wind of change", signalling that his Government was likely to support decolonisation.
1961 – The United States Air Force begins Operation Looking Glass, and over the next 30 years, a "Doomsday Plane" is always in the air, with the capability of taking direct control of the United States' bombers and missiles in the event of the destruction of the SAC's command post.
1966 – The Soviet Union's Luna 9 becomes the first spacecraft to make a soft landing on the Moon, and the first spacecraft to take pictures from the surface of the Moon.
1971 – New York Police Officer Frank Serpico is shot during a drug bust in Brooklyn and survives to later testify against police corruption. 
1972 – The first day of the seven-day 1972 Iran blizzard, which would kill at least 4,000 people, making it the deadliest snowstorm in history.
1984 – Doctor John Buster and a research team at Harbor-UCLA Medical Center in the United States announce history's first embryo transfer, from one woman to another resulting in a live birth.
  1984   – Space Shuttle program: STS-41-B is launched using Space Shuttle Challenger.
1989 – After a stroke two weeks previously, South African President P. W. Botha resigns as leader of the National Party, but stays on as president for six more months.
  1989   – A military coup overthrows Alfredo Stroessner, dictator of Paraguay since 1954.
1994 – Space Shuttle program: STS-60 is launched, carrying Sergei Krikalev, the first Russian cosmonaut to fly aboard the Shuttle.
1995 – Astronaut Eileen Collins becomes the first woman to pilot the Space Shuttle as mission STS-63 gets underway from Kennedy Space Center in Florida.
1998 – Cavalese cable car disaster: A United States military pilot causes the death of 20 people when his low-flying plane cuts the cable of a cable-car near Trento, Italy.
2005 – One hundred five people are killed when Kam Air Flight 904 crashes in the Pamir Mountains in Afghanistan.
2007 – A Baghdad market bombing kills at least 135 people and injures a further 339.
2014 – Two people are shot and killed and 29 students are taken hostage at a high school in Moscow, Russia.
2023 – 2023 Ohio train derailment: A freight train containing vinyl chloride and other hazardous materials derails and burns in East Palestine, Ohio, United States, releasing hydrogen chloride and phosgene into the air and contaminating the Ohio River.

Births

Pre-1600
1338 – Joanna of Bourbon (d. 1378)
1392 – Henry Percy, 2nd Earl of Northumberland, English nobleman and military commander (d. 1455)
1428 – Helena Palaiologina, Queen of Cyprus (d. 1458) 
1478 – Edward Stafford, 3rd Duke of Buckingham (d. 1521)
1504 – Scipione Rebiba, Italian cardinal (d. 1577)

1601–1900
1677 – Jan Santini Aichel, Czech architect, designed the Karlova Koruna Chateau (d. 1723)
1689 – Blas de Lezo, Spanish admiral (d. 1741)
1721 – Friedrich Wilhelm von Seydlitz, Prussian general (d. 1773)
1736 – Johann Georg Albrechtsberger, Austrian composer and theorist (d. 1809)
1747 – Samuel Osgood, American soldier and politician, 1st United States Postmaster General (d. 1813)
1757 – Joseph Forlenze, Italian ophthalmologist and surgeon (d. 1833)
1763 – Caroline von Wolzogen, German author (d. 1847)
1777 – John Cheyne, Scottish physician and author (d. 1836)
1780 – Mihail G. Boiagi, Aromanian grammarian and professor (d. uncertain)
1790 – Gideon Mantell, English scientist (d. 1852)
1795 – Antonio José de Sucre, Venezuelan general and politician, 2nd President of Bolivia (d. 1830)
1807 – Joseph E. Johnston, American general and politician (d. 1891)
1809 – Felix Mendelssohn, German pianist, composer, and conductor (d. 1847)
1811 – Horace Greeley, American journalist and politician (d. 1872)
1816 – Ram Singh Kuka, Indian credited with starting the Non-cooperation movement
1815 – Edward James Roye, 5th President of Liberia (d. 1872)
1817 – Achille Ernest Oscar Joseph Delesse, French geologist and mineralogist (d. 1881)
  1817   – Émile Prudent, French pianist and composer (d. 1864)
1821 – Elizabeth Blackwell, American physician and educator (d. 1910)
1824 – Ranald MacDonald, American explorer and educator (d. 1894)
1826 – Walter Bagehot, English journalist and businessman (d. 1877)
1830 – Robert Gascoyne-Cecil, 3rd Marquess of Salisbury, English politician, Prime Minister of the United Kingdom (d. 1903)
1840 – Allan McLean, Scottish-Australian politician, 19th Premier of Victoria (d. 1911)
1842 – Sidney Lanier, American composer and poet (d. 1881)
1843 – William Cornelius Van Horne, American-Canadian businessman (d. 1915)
1857 – Giuseppe Moretti, Italian sculptor, designed the Vulcan statue (d. 1935)
1859 – Hugo Junkers, German engineer, designed the Junkers J 1 (d. 1935)
1862 – James Clark McReynolds, American lawyer and judge (d. 1946)
1867 – Charles Henry Turner, American biologist, educator and zoologist (d. 1923)
1872 – Lou Criger, American baseball player and manager (d. 1934)
1874 – Gertrude Stein, American novelist, poet, playwright, (d. 1946)
1878 – Gordon Coates, New Zealand soldier and politician, 21st Prime Minister of New Zealand (d. 1943)
1887 – Georg Trakl, Austrian pharmacist and poet (d. 1914)
1889 – Artur Adson, Estonian poet, playwright, and critic (d. 1977)
  1889   – Carl Theodor Dreyer, Danish director and screenwriter (d. 1968)
  1889   – Risto Ryti, Finnish lawyer, politician and the Governor of the Bank of Finland; 5th President of Finland (d. 1956)
1892 – Juan Negrín, Spanish physician and politician, 67th Prime Minister of Spain (d. 1956)
1893 – Gaston Julia, Algerian-French mathematician and academic (d. 1978)
1894 – Norman Rockwell, American painter and illustrator (d. 1978)
1898 – Alvar Aalto, Finnish architect, designed the Finlandia Hall and Aalto Theatre (d. 1976)
1899 – Café Filho, Brazilian journalist, lawyer, and politician, 18th President of Brazil (d. 1970)
1900 – Mabel Mercer, English-American singer (d. 1984)

1901–present
1903 – Douglas Douglas-Hamilton, 14th Duke of Hamilton, Scottish soldier, pilot, and politician (d. 1973)
1904 – Pretty Boy Floyd, American gangster (d. 1934)
1905 – Paul Ariste, Estonian linguist and academic (d. 1990)
  1905   – Arne Beurling, Swedish-American mathematician and academic (d. 1986)
1906 – George Adamson, Indian-English author and activist (d. 1989) 
1907 – James A. Michener, American author and philanthropist (d. 1997)
1909 – André Cayatte, French lawyer and director (d. 1989)
  1909   – Simone Weil, French mystic and philosopher (d. 1943)
1911 – Jehan Alain, French organist and composer (d. 1940)
1912 – Jacques Soustelle, French anthropologist and politician (d. 1990)
1914 – Mary Carlisle, American actress, singer, and dancer (d. 2018)
1915 – Johannes Kotkas, Estonian wrestler and hammer thrower (d. 1998)
1917 – Shlomo Goren, Polish-Israeli rabbi and general (d. 1994)
1918 – Joey Bishop, American actor and producer (d. 2007)
  1918   – Helen Stephens, American runner, baseball player, and manager (d. 1994)
1920 – Russell Arms, American actor and singer (d. 2012)
  1920   – Tony Gaze, Australian race car driver and pilot (d. 2013)
  1920   – Henry Heimlich, American physician and author (d. 2016)
1924 – E. P. Thompson, English historian and author (d. 1993)
  1924   – Martial Asselin, Canadian lawyer and politician, 25th Lieutenant Governor of Quebec (d. 2013)
1925 – Shelley Berman, American actor and comedian (d. 2017)
  1925   – John Fiedler, American actor (d. 2005)
1926 – Hans-Jochen Vogel, German lawyer and politician, 8th Mayor of Berlin (d. 2020)
1927 – Kenneth Anger, American actor, director, and screenwriter
  1927   – Blas Ople, Filipino journalist and politician, 21st President of the Senate of the Philippines (d. 2003)
1933 – Paul Sarbanes, American lawyer and politician (d. 2020)
1934 – Juan Carlos Calabró, Argentinian actor and screenwriter (d. 2013)
1935 – Johnny "Guitar" Watson, American blues, soul, and funk singer-songwriter and guitarist (d. 1996)
1936 – Elizabeth Peer, American journalist (d. 1984)
  1936   – Bob Simpson, Australian cricketer and coach
1937 – Billy Meier, Swiss author and photographer
1938 – Victor Buono, American actor (d. 1982)
  1938   – Emile Griffith, American boxer and trainer (d. 2013)
1939 – Michael Cimino, American director, producer, and screenwriter (d. 2016)
1940 – Fran Tarkenton, American football player and sportscaster
1941 – Dory Funk, Jr., American wrestler and trainer
  1941   – Howard Phillips, American lawyer and politician (d. 2013)
1943 – Blythe Danner, American actress
  1943   – Dennis Edwards, American soul/R&B singer (d. 2018)
  1943   – Eric Haydock, English bass player (d. 2019)
  1943   – Shawn Phillips, American-South African singer-songwriter and guitarist
1945 – Johnny Cymbal, Scottish-American singer-songwriter and producer (d. 1993)
  1945   – Bob Griese, American football player and sportscaster
1947 – Paul Auster, American novelist, essayist, and poet
  1947   – Dave Davies, English musician
  1947   – Stephen McHattie, Canadian actor and director
1948 – Henning Mankell, Swedish author and playwright (d. 2015)
1949 – Jim Thorpe, American golfer
1950 – Morgan Fairchild, American actress
  1950   – Grant Goldman, Australian radio and television host (d. 2020)
1951 – Eugenijus Riabovas, Lithuanian footballer and manager
  1951   – Michael Ruppert, American journalist and author (d. 2014)
1952 – Fred Lynn, American baseball player and sportscaster
1954 – Tiger Williams, Canadian ice hockey player and coach
1956 – John Jefferson, American football player and coach
  1956   – Nathan Lane, American actor and comedian
1957 – Eric Lander, American mathematician, geneticist, and academic
1958 – Joe F. Edwards, Jr., American commander, pilot, and astronaut
  1958   – Douglas Holtz-Eakin, American economist
  1958   – Greg Mankiw, American economist and academic
1959 – Óscar Iván Zuluaga, Colombian economist and politician, 67th Colombian Minister of Finance
1960 – Joachim Löw, German footballer and manager
1961 – Linda Eder, American singer and actress
1963 – Raghuram Rajan, Indian economist and academic
1963 – Vũ Đức Đam, Vietnamese politician
1964 – Indrek Tarand, Estonian historian, journalist, and politician
1965 – Maura Tierney, American actress and producer
1966 – Frank Coraci, American director and screenwriter
  1966   – Danny Morrison, New Zealand cricketer and sportscaster 
1967 – Tim Flowers, English footballer and coach
  1967   – Mixu Paatelainen, Finnish footballer and coach
1968 – Vlade Divac, Serbian-American basketball player and sportscaster
  1968   – Marwan Khoury, Lebanese singer, songwriter, and composer
1969 – Beau Biden, American soldier, lawyer, and politician, 44th Attorney General of Delaware (d. 2015)
  1969   – Retief Goosen, South African golfer
1970 – Óscar Córdoba, Colombian footballer
  1970   – Warwick Davis, English actor, producer, and screenwriter
1971 – Sarah Kane, English playwright (d. 1999)
  1971   – Hong Seok-cheon, South Korean actor
1972 – Jesper Kyd, Danish pianist and composer
1973 – Ilana Sod, Mexican journalist and producer
1976 – Isla Fisher, Omani-Australian actress. 
  1976   – Tim Heidecker, American actor, comedian, and musician
  1976   – Eihi Shiina Japanese fashion model and actress
1977 – Daddy Yankee, American-Puerto Rican singer, songwriter, rapper, actor and record producer
  1977   – Marek Židlický, Czech ice hockey player
1978 – Joan Capdevila, Spanish footballer
  1978   – Amal Clooney, British-Lebanese barrister and activist
1979 – Paul Franks, English cricketer and coach
1982 – Becky Bayless, American wrestler 
  1982   – Marie-Ève Drolet, Canadian speed skater
1984 – Elizabeth Holmes, American fraudster, founder of Theranos
1985 – Angela Fong, Canadian wrestler and actress
  1985   – Andrei Kostitsyn, Belarusian ice hockey player
1986 – Lucas Duda, American baseball player
  1986   – Mathieu Giroux, Canadian speed skater
  1986   – Kanako Yanagihara, Japanese actress
1987 – Elvana Gjata, Albanian singer
1988 – Cho Kyu-hyun, South Korean singer
1989 – Meng Jia, Chinese singer and actress
  1989   – Slobodan Rajković, Serbian footballer
1990 – Sean Kingston, American-Jamaican singer-songwriter
  1990   – Martin Taupau, New Zealand rugby league player
1991 – Corey Norman, Australian rugby league player
1992 – Olli Aitola, Finnish ice hockey player
1995 – Tao Tsuchiya, Japanese actress
1998 – Tyler Huntley, American football player
1999 – Kanna Hashimoto, Japanese actress
2003 – Lozea Vilarino, French rhythmic gymnast

Deaths

Pre-1600
6 – Ping, emperor of the Han Dynasty (b. 9 BC)
 456 – Sihyaj Chan K'awiil II, ruler of Tikal
 639 – K'inich Yo'nal Ahk I, ruler of Piedras Negras
 699 – Werburgh, English nun and saint
 865 – Ansgar, Frankish archbishop (b. 801)
 929 – Guy, margrave of Tuscany
 938 – Zhou Ben, Chinese general (b. 862)
 994 – William IV, duke of Aquitaine (b. 937)
1014 – Sweyn Forkbeard, king of Denmark and England (b. 960)
1116 – Coloman, king of Hungary
1161 – Inge I, king of Norway (b. 1135)
1252 – Sviatoslav III, Russian Grand Prince (b. 1196)
1399 – John of Gaunt, Belgian-English politician, Lord High Steward (b. 1340)
1428 – Ashikaga Yoshimochi, Japanese shōgun (b. 1386)
1451 – Murad II, Ottoman sultan (b. 1404)
1468 – Johannes Gutenberg, German publisher, invented the Printing press (b. 1398)
1475 – John IV, Count of Nassau-Siegen, German count (b. 1410)
1537 – Thomas FitzGerald, 10th Earl of Kildare (b. 1513)
1566 – George Cassander, Flemish theologian and author (b. 1513)

1601–1900
1618 – Philip II, duke of Pomerania (b. 1573)
1619 – Henry Brooke, 11th Baron Cobham, English politician, Lord Warden of the Cinque Ports (b. 1564)
1737 – Tommaso Ceva, Italian mathematician and academic (b. 1648)
1802 – Pedro Rodríguez, Spanish statesman and economist (b. 1723)
1813 – Juan Bautista Cabral, Argentinian sergeant (b. 1789)
1820 – Gia Long, Vietnamese emperor (b. 1762)
1832 – George Crabbe, English surgeon and poet (b. 1754)
1862 – Jean-Baptiste Biot, French physicist, astronomer, and mathematician (b. 1774)
1866 – François-Xavier Garneau, Canadian poet, author, and historian (b. 1809)
1873 – Isaac Baker Brown, English gynecologist and surgeon (b. 1811)
1899 – Geert Adriaans Boomgaard, Dutch supercentenarian (b. 1788)

1901–present
1922 – Christiaan de Wet, South African general and politician, State President of the Orange Free State (b. 1854)
  1922   – John Butler Yeats, Irish painter and illustrator (b. 1839)
1924 – Woodrow Wilson, American historian, academic, and politician, 28th President of the United States, Nobel Prize laureate (b. 1856)
1929 – Agner Krarup Erlang, Danish mathematician and engineer (b. 1878)
1935 – Hugo Junkers, German engineer, designed the Junkers J 1 (b. 1859)
1944 – Yvette Guilbert, French singer and actress (b. 1865)
1945 – Roland Freisler, German lawyer and judge (b. 1893)
1947 – Marc Mitscher, American admiral and pilot (b. 1887)
1952 – Harold L. Ickes, American journalist and politician, 32nd United States Secretary of the Interior (b. 1874)
1955 – Vasily Blokhin, Russian general (b. 1895)
1956 – Émile Borel, French mathematician and academic (b. 1871)
  1956   – Johnny Claes, English-Belgian race car driver and trumpet player (b. 1916)
1959 – The Day the Music Died
                The Big Bopper, American singer-songwriter and guitarist (b. 1930)
                Buddy Holly, American singer-songwriter and guitarist (b. 1936)
                Ritchie Valens, American singer-songwriter and guitarist (b. 1941)
1960 – Fred Buscaglione, Italian singer and actor (b. 1921)
1961 – William Morrison, 1st Viscount Dunrossil, Scottish-Australian captain and politician, 14th Governor-General of Australia (b. 1893)
  1961   – Anna May Wong, American actress (b. 1905)
1963 – Benjamin R. Jacobs, American biochemist (b. 1879)
1967 – Joe Meek, English songwriter and producer (b. 1929)
1969 – C. N. Annadurai, Indian journalist and politician, 7th Chief Minister of Madras State (b. 1909)
  1969   – Eduardo Mondlane, Mozambican activist and academic (b. 1920)
1975 – William D. Coolidge, American physicist and engineer (b. 1873)
  1975   – Umm Kulthum, Egyptian singer-songwriter and actress (b. 1904)
1985 – Frank Oppenheimer, American physicist and academic (b. 1912)
1989 – John Cassavetes, American actor, director, and screenwriter (b. 1929)
  1989   – Lionel Newman, American pianist, composer, and conductor (b. 1916)
1991 – Nancy Kulp, American actress (b. 1921)
1993 – Françoys Bernier, Canadian pianist and conductor (b. 1927)
1996 – Audrey Meadows, American actress and banker (b. 1922)
1999 – Gwen Guthrie, American singer-songwriter and pianist (b. 1950)
2005 – Zurab Zhvania, Georgian biologist and politician, 4th Prime Minister of Georgia (b. 1963)
  2005   – Ernst Mayr, German-American biologist and ornithologist (b. 1904)
2006 – Al Lewis, American actor and activist (b. 1923)
2009 – Sheng-yen, Chinese monk and scholar, founded the Dharma Drum Mountain (b. 1930)
2010 – Dick McGuire, American basketball player and coach (b. 1926)
  2010   – Frances Reid, American actress (b. 1914)
2011 – Maria Schneider, French actress (b. 1952)
2012 – Toh Chin Chye, Singaporean academic and politician, 1st Deputy Prime Minister of Singapore (b. 1921)
  2012   – Ben Gazzara, American actor and director (b. 1930)
  2012   – Terence Hildner, American general (b. 1962)
  2012   – Raj Kanwar, Indian director, producer, and screenwriter (b. 1961)
  2012   – Zalman King, American actor, director, and producer (b. 1942)
  2012   – Andrzej Szczeklik, Polish physician and academic (b. 1938)
2013 – Cardiss Collins, American politician (b. 1931)
  2013   – Oscar Feltsman, Ukrainian-Russian composer and producer (b. 1921)
  2013   – James Muri, American soldier and pilot (b. 1918)
  2013   – Jam Mohammad Yousaf, Pakistani politician, Chief Minister of Balochistan (b. 1954)
2015 – Martin Gilbert, English historian, author, and academic (b. 1936)
  2015   – Mary Healy, American actress and singer (b. 1918)
  2015   – Charlie Sifford, American golfer (b. 1922)
  2015   – Nasim Hasan Shah, Pakistani lawyer and judge, 12th Chief Justice of Pakistan (b. 1929)
2016 – Joe Alaskey, American actor (b. 1952)
  2016   – Balram Jakhar, Indian lawyer and politician, 23rd Governor of Madhya Pradesh (b. 1923)
  2016   – József Kasza, Serbian politician and economist (b. 1945)
2017 – Dritëro Agolli, Albanian poet, writer and politician (b. 1931)
2019 – Julie Adams, American actress (b. 1926)
  2019   – Kristoff St. John, American actor (b. 1966)
2020 – George Steiner, French-American philosopher, author, and critic (b. 1929)

Holidays and observances
 Christian feast day:
 Aaron the Illustrious (Syriac Orthodox Church)
 Ansgar
 Berlinda of Meerbeke
 Blaise
 Celsa and Nona
 Claudine Thévenet
 Dom Justo Takayama (Philippines and Japan)
 Hadelin
 Margaret of England
 Werburgh
 February 3 (Eastern Orthodox liturgics)
 Day of the Virgin of Suyapa (Honduras)
 Earliest day on which Shrove Tuesday can fall, while March 9 is the latest; celebrated on Tuesday before Ash Wednesday (Christianity)
 Four Chaplains Day (United States, also considered a Feast Day by the Episcopal Church)
 Communist Party of Vietnam Foundation Anniversary (Vietnam)
 Day of Finnish architecture and design, birthday of Alvar Aalto (Finland)
 Heroes' Day (Mozambique)
 Martyrs' Day (São Tomé and Príncipe)
 Setsubun (Japan)
 Veterans' Day (Thailand)

References

External links

 BBC: On This Day
 
 Historical Events on February 3

Days of the year
February